Rystseva Gorka is a rural locality (a village) in Rakulo-Kokshengskoye Rural Settlement of Velsky District, Arkhangelsk Oblast, Russia. The population was 2 as of 2014.

Geography 
Rystseva Gorka is located on the Kokshenga River, 62 km northeast of Velsk (the district's administrative centre) by road. Pugachyovskaya is the nearest rural locality.

References 

Rural localities in Velsky District